A bicycle mechanic or bike mechanic is a mechanic who can perform a wide range of repairs on bicycles. Bicycle mechanics can be employed in various types of stores, ranging from large department stores to small local bike shops; cycling teams, or bicycle manufacturers.

Classification and wages 
The New York State Department of Labor describes bicycle repair as a "realistic" occupation, meaning an occupation that would be enjoyed by somebody who likes "practical, hands-on problems," dealing with "real-world materials like wood, tools, and machinery," and one that "does not involve a lot of paperwork or working closely with others." They classify it as a job that "usually requires a high school diploma and may require some vocational training or job-related course work. In some cases, an associate's or bachelor's degree could be needed. Employees in these occupations need anywhere from a few months to one year of working with
experienced employees." They indicate an annual wage in the neighborhood of $25,000, but can earn up to a little more than $40,000. "In 2002, employment for bicycle repairers in New York was 360."

Skills and training 

The skills involved in maintaining racing bicycles and other specialized bicycles of course go beyond the basics outlined in New York's "occupational brief." Well-known schools offering advanced training for bicycle mechanics include the United Bicycle Institute of Ashland, Oregon, Barnett Bicycle Institute of Colorado Springs, and Appalachian Bicycle Institute of Asheville, North Carolina. The Park Tool Co., a well-known maker of bicycle mechanic's tools, has an outreach training program called the Park Tool School which is made available at many local bike shops, taught by local bike shop personnel with the assistance of training materials and manuals from Park Tool.

One common avenue for entering the trade is to start as a bike builder or assembler at a local bike shop. This job can range from simply finishing the assembly started at the factory (attaching wheels and handlebars) to more thorough builds in which all systems are re-adjusted to a given level of quality. The range of assembly involvement varies from shop to shop.

In Canada there are a variety of bicycle mechanic training programs, including the BAM (Bicycle Assembly & Maintenance) program in Toronto which has been accredited by the Bicycle Trade Association of Canada (BTAC) and funded by the Ontario government. Students in the BAM program complete an 8 week program at the Learning Enrichment Foundation followed by working one week in a local Toronto bicycle shop of their choice proving their skills by assembling new bicycles and fixing old bicycles.

Documentation 
A few books on being a bicycle mechanic are still in print.  The most recent is Bike Mechanic: Tales from the Road and the Workshop which interviews top professional bicycle technicians on their daily lives as mechanics for professional cycling teams.

Among many references on bicycle repair, Barnett's Manual is a comprehensive four-volume set, most recently released in print in 2003 at a retail price of $124.95, that includes detailed coverage and diagrams of bicycle components from many different manufacturers. The Lonely Planet cycling guide says, "If you want to know more about maintaining your bike... Richard's Bicycle Book is a classic. If you want to know absolutely everything get Barnett's Manual... or Sutherland's Handbook". VeloNews magazine cites Lennard Zinn's best-selling road bike and mountain bike maintenance and repair books as essential for DIY home mechanics.

See also 

Bicycle
Bicycle frame
Bicycle tools
Derailleur gears
Derailleur hanger
List of bicycle parts
Local bike shop
Mechanic
Spoke wrench
Wheelbuilding

References 
 Bicycle repairers (.pdf) New York State Department of Labor "Occupational Brief"
 
 
 Connellan, I et al. (2001), Lonely Planet Cycling Britain (Cycling Guides), Lonely Planet Publications, 
 
 
 
 

Mechanic
Mechanics (trade)
Sports occupations and roles
Installation, maintenance, and repair occupations